Blood Games is a 1989 exploitation film directed by Tanya Rosenberg and starring Gregory Cummins, Laura Albert, and Shelley Abblett.  The film concerns the plight of a stranded all-girl baseball team.

Plot
After 'Babe & The Ball Girls', a team of female softball players, trounces the local team, their travel bus breaks down in the woods. Attempting to hike to safety, they end up getting lost and the group is set upon by disgruntled fans of the losing team. They are beaten, raped and some murdered. They desperately fight back with baseball bats and guns.

Cast

 Laura Albert as Babe
 Ross Hagen as Midnight
 Ernest Wall as Vern 
 Julie Hall as Stoney
 Luke Shay as Mino Collins 
 Gregory Cummings as Roy Collins
 Shelley Abblett as Donna 
 Don Dowe as Holt
 Rhyve Sawyer as Wanda
 Paula Manga as Louise
 Sabrina Hills as Connie
 Randi Randolph as Ingrid
 Sonjia Redd as Shorty
 Lisa Zambrano as Mickey
 Doc Willis as Ronnie

Reception

From contemporary reviews, Variety referred to the film as an "attractively packaged but uninteresting entry for vid fans" noting that Tanya Rosenberg's direction was "below par" and that the "cast is attractive but never convincing as athletes. Acting is generally poor."  Michael Weldon wrote the film suffers from having too many slow motion scenes, but declared it was "not as bad as it could have been".

From retrospective reviews, John Kenneth Muir wrote in his book Horror Films of the 1990s that the film was "a horror movie that is more than just watchable. It's compelling, entertaining and scary. And, yes, entirely exploitive." Muir compared the film to I Spit on Your Grave, stating that the film "panders in true exploitation movie fashion" with long locker room and shower scenes but also with the way it exploits women's bodies it also makes a point that they are exploited creatures. In discussing the chick flicks of the horror genre, author Philip Green wrote that Blood Games is "also the most visually erotic of the movies in this genre",

References

Footnotes

Sources

External links
  Blood Games at the Internet Movie Database

1989 films
American exploitation films
1980s English-language films
1980s American films